Fuscocerrena is a fungal genus in the family Polyporaceae. It is a monotypic genus, containing the single polypore species Fuscocerrena portoricensis, found in eastern North America, Central America, and South America.

Taxonomy
Fuscocerrena was circumscribed by Norwegian mycologist Leif Ryvarden in 1982 to contain the fungus originally described by Elias Fries as Polyporus portoricensis. This species was also previously placed in Cerrenella, a genus proposed by William Murrill in 1905, but later abandoned.

Description
The genus is characterized by its irregular fruit body that when fresh is farinose (covered by a white, mealy powder) and greenish white in colour; older fruit bodies become dark brown. Microscopically, the fungus features a dimitic hyphal system, generative hyphae with clamp connections, and dendrohyphidia (small, spiderweb-like hyphae)–a characteristic, which although common in the family Corticiaceae, is seldom encountered in the Polyporaceae. The spores of Fuscocerrena portoricensis are hyaline, cylindrical, and non-amyloid, measuring 5–7 by 2–2.5 μm.

Habitat and distribution
Fuscocerrena portoricensis is found in eastern North America, Central America, and South America, and has also been collected in Cuba and Jamaica. It grows on decomposing deciduous wood.

References

Fungi of the Caribbean
Fungi of the United States
Fungi of Central America
Fungi of Mexico
Fungi of South America
Polyporaceae
Monotypic Polyporales genera
Taxa named by Leif Ryvarden
Fungi described in 1982
Fungi without expected TNC conservation status